
Year 315 BC was a year of the pre-Julian Roman calendar. At the time, it was known as the Year of the Consulship of Cursor and Philo (or, less frequently, year 439 Ab urbe condita). The denomination 315 BC for this year has been used since the early medieval period, when the Anno Domini calendar era became the prevalent method in Europe for naming years.

Events 
 By place 

 Macedonian Empire
 Antigonus claims authority over most of Asia, seizes the treasury at Susa and enters Babylon, where Seleucus is governor. Seleucus flees to Ptolemy in Egypt and enters into a league with him, Lysimachus (the ruler of Thrace) and Cassander, against Antigonus. This leads to the First Coalition War.
 Aristodemus of Miletus, by order of Antigonus, sails to Laconia, where he receives permission from the Spartans to recruit 8000 mercenaries. He also Meets Alexander (son of Polyperchon) and Polyperchon, thus establishing friendship between them and Antigonus 
 Polyperchon is appointed general of the Peloponnesus 
 Alexander (son of Polyperchon) sails to Antigonus in Asia. They make a pact of friendship and, by order of Antigonus, Alexander sails back to the Peloponnesus       
 Peithon consolidates his power base in the eastern part of the Empire. 
 Antigonus drives out Cassander's Macedonian forces of occupation from the Greek islands and forms the island cities in the Aegean into the "League of the Islanders", preparatory to his invasion of Greece. His ally, the city of Rhodes, furnishes him with the necessary fleet.

 Greece 
 The King of Epirus, Aeacides, faces a revolt from his people and they drive him from the kingdom. His son, Phyrrhus, who is then only two years old, is saved from being killed by some faithful servants. Cassander takes control of Epirus.
 In Macedonia the port city of Thessaloniki is founded by Cassander and named after his wife Thessalonike.
Cassander appoints Apollonides (governor of Argos) as Governor of Argos      
Apollonides (governor of Argos) initiates a raid on Arcadia during the night.      
Cassander sends Prepelaus to Alexander (son of Polyperchon) and he convinces Alexander to desert Antigonus by offering command of all the Peloponnesus and making him general of an army

 Cyprus 
 Ptolemy's armies fight supporters of Antigonus in Cyprus. Ptolemy is able to re-conquer the island.

 Sicily 
 Agathocles, the tyrant of Syracuse, seizes the city of Messina.

 Roman Republic 
The Romans take Ferentum, a city of Apulia, and this pushes the citizens of Nuceria to end their friendship with Rome.

 India 
The Indian king Porus, ally of Alexander The Great, is killed by Eudemus, another general of Alexander. The son of Porus, Malayketu, seizes his territory back by killing Eudemus.

 In fiction 
 In the historical novel Funeral Games by Mary Renault, Cassander visits the Lyceum in Athens and tells Theophrastos evil slanderous lies against Alexander the Great.

Births 
 Aratus, Macedonian Greek mathematician, astronomer, meteorologist, botanist and poet (d. 240 BC)

Deaths 
 Zhou Shen Jing Wang, King of the Zhou Dynasty of China

References